is a railway station in the town of Takanezawa, Tochigi, Japan, operated by the East Japan Railway Company (JR East).

Lines

Station layout
The station consists of one side platform serving a single track. The station is unattended.

History
The kanji of its name was changed to the present spelling on 1 April 1925. A new station building was completed in March 2014.

Surrounding area
Niita Post Office

See also
 List of railway stations in Japan

References

External links

 JR East Station information 

Railway stations in Tochigi Prefecture
Railway stations in Japan opened in 1923
Karasuyama Line
Takanezawa, Tochigi
Stations of East Japan Railway Company